Polish Management or Polish Economy is a 1928 German propaganda silent film directed by E. W. Emo and starring Iwa Wanja, Margot Landa, and Hans Brausewetter. It was one of a number of films attacking Poland's ownership of lands in which ethnic Germans lived during the 1920s.

The film's art direction was by Kurt Richter.

Cast

References

Bibliography

External links

1928 films
Films of the Weimar Republic
Films directed by E. W. Emo
German silent feature films
German black-and-white films